An Introduction To The American Underground Film is a book by the American author Sheldon Renan.  It was published by Dutton in 1967.  It was the first book about Underground Film.

Written at the dawn of film studies as an academic subject it was used by many teachers as the guide to the study of Underground Film, a term that prior to the publication of this book was not widely disseminated.

Structure

Opposite the title page is this statement: .... "Sheldon Renan was born in Portland, Oregon in 1941. He became addicted to the film medium during his four years at Yale University, where he was a member of the Scholar of the House Program. After graduation in 1963, he spent much of his time scurrying from one movie theatre to another, and did not emerge from the darkness until 1966, when he married, wrote this book, and settled near San Francisco."

There is a Foreword by Willard Van Dyke.

There are six chapters, An appendix, bibliography and index.

Chapters

Defining Underground Film 

The first chapter of the book addresses what an underground film is. Renan gives this summation:  "It is a film conceived and made essentially by one person and is a personal statement by that person. It is a film that dissents radically in form, or in technique, or in content, or perhaps in all three. It is usually made for very little money, frequently under a thousand dollars, and its exhibition is outside commercial film channels."

A History of Avant Garde/Experimental/Underground Film 

Chapter two is about film forms that led to the Underground.  Although the title of the book states it was about American films, the book looks at European avant garde, in France, Germany and Russia in the Twenties and Thirties. It also divides American underground film into three ages:  The  pre-Depression era, which included work by Ralph Steiner, Robert Flaherty and Paul Fejos; the era brought in with the availability of 16mm film making that was primarily on the West Coast, that included work by Maya Deren, Sidney Peterson and Kenneth Anger; and the New York-based third wave in the sixties that included Stan Brakhage, Bruce Conner and the Kuchar Brothers.

A Gallery of Film-Makers 

Chapter three has biographical information on the artists who were making Underground Films. It starts with Kenneth Anger and ends with Andy Warhol. Renan concentrates on film directors. The book includes a wide range of filmmakers who were active at the time. Some well known, such as Andy Warhol. Some are much less well known, such as Peter Emmanuel Goldman.

Stars of Underground Film 
Chapter four examines the actors and actresses of Underground Film. It is the shortest, twelve pages, chapter in the book,  It starts with an essay about performers who often worked without pay or wide recognition such as Claes Oldenburg, Taylor Mead and Edie Sedgewick. It also states that many of the performers in Underground were also filmmakers themselves, such as Jack Smith.  The chapter concludes with a special mention of Marie Menken, calling her the Underground's "Main character actress" and mentioning various films she appeared in, including works by Jack Smith, Andy Warhol and Charles Boultenhouse.

The Underground Establishment 

Chapter five examines the aspects of underground film that involved appreciation, distribution and exhibition.  It includes information on Jonas Mekas, publishing Film Culture and forming the New American Cinema Group and founding the Filmmakers Cooperative. The chapter also examines the museums and schools where Underground Films were screened due to their lack of commercial possibilities.  It also listed various publications that promoted Underground Film such as The Canyon Cinema News and the Village Voice.

Expanded Cinema 

The final chapter looks at efforts to move cinema beyond standard screenings of just projector and screen.  That included information on using multiple projectors and multiple screens, and included film/dance and film/theater.  It also has information on computer generated images and electronic manipulation on television.

Appendix 

Information on "Where to Rent the Films" that includes addresses for Brandon Films, Canyon Cinema, Filmmakers Coop,  Museum of Modern Art Dept of Film, and others.

References

1967 non-fiction books
Books about film
American non-fiction books